Yawkey (also Porter Fork) is an unincorporated community in eastern Lincoln County, West Virginia, United States.  It lies at the intersection of West Virginia Routes 3 and 214, east of the town of Hamlin, the county seat of Lincoln County.  Its elevation is 738 feet (225 m).  Although it is unincorporated, it had a post office, with the ZIP code 25573.

The community most likely was named after the Yawkey family.

1950s TV personality Dagmar was born in Yawkey.

Gallery

References

External links

Unincorporated communities in Lincoln County, West Virginia
Coal towns in West Virginia